Zaysan or Zaisan (Cyrillic: Зайсан) can refer to:
Lake Zaysan in eastern Kazakhstan
Zaysan (town) or Zaisan, Kazakhstan
Zaysan District in East Kazakhstan Province, Kazakhstan
Zaisan Memorial in Ulaanbaatar, Mongolia